About Her is a Canadian documentary film, directed by Phyllis Ellis and aired in 2011. Narrated by Kim Cattrall, the film profiles a number of women battling the HER2 strain of breast cancer.

A shorter version of the film premiered at Toronto's Breast Fest Film Festival in 2009, before being expanded into a full-length film. The longer film was again screened at Breast Fest, along with a television broadcast on W Network.

The film won the Donald Brittain Award for Best Social/Political Documentary Program at the 1st Canadian Screen Awards in 2012.

References

External links 
 

2011 television films
2011 films
Canadian documentary television films
Donald Brittain Award winning shows
Documentary films about cancer
2010s Canadian films